Monster Trucks is a 2016 American live action/computer animated monster comedy film produced by Paramount Animation, Nickelodeon Movies and Disruption Entertainment for Paramount Pictures. It was directed by Chris Wedge, in both his live-action directorial debut and first directorial effort outside of Blue Sky Studios, and written by Derek Connolly, from a story by Jonathan Aibel, Glenn Berger and Matthew Robinson. The film stars Lucas Till, Jane Levy, Amy Ryan, Rob Lowe, Danny Glover, Barry Pepper and Holt McCallany, and follows a high schooler who finds an escaped monster living in his truck.

The film premiered on December 23, 2016, in France. It was released in the United States on January 13, 2017, and received mixed-to-negative reviews from critics. A box office failure, Monster Trucks grossed $64 million worldwide against its $125 million budget.

Plot

Terravex Oil is in the midst of a fracking operation in North Dakota, overseen by CEO Reece Tenneson and geologist Jim Dowd. The operation releases three subterranean creatures from an underground water system and destroys the drilling rig. Two are captured by Terravex, but one of them escapes. Meanwhile, high school senior Tripp Coley has taken up a job at a junkyard, where he builds a pickup truck in hopes of being able to leave his town. The truck doesn't have a working drivetrain (no engine). One night, Tripp encounters the escaped creature in the junkyard and captures it, but the creature escapes before he can seek authorities.

The next day, Tripp, discovers that the creature feeds on oil, and has taken shelter in the hood of his truck. He befriends him, names him Creech, and promises to help him get home. Tripp modifies the truck to give Creech more control as a makeshift engine. The truck acts as a 'wheelchair' for Creech to operate. Meanwhile, Tenneson is still concerned about the incident at the drilling rig, since similar experiments have revealed the existence of other creatures. He decides to protect the company's image by drilling poison into a hole leading to the underwater tunnels, and by sending hired mercenary Burke to kill their captured creatures, to the objection of Dowd, as he finds the monsters have significant intelligence and emotions, as well as a hive mind intelligence that allows both of the captured specimens to learn what was taught to one.

Tripp and Meredith go see Tripp's father Wade to seek help, but Wade sells Tripp out to Burke. Tripp and Meredith escape in the truck with Creech. Tripp, Meredith and Creech are chased by Burke and his team along with Rick. They escape by jumping over a MRL local with an EMD MP15DC lead train, and camping at a hunting cabin.

When Creech gets the sense something bad will happen to the other creatures, he heads to Terravex headquarters where other creatures are being held captive. Tripp and Meredith follow Creech. When they arrive, they find Creech's parents, but are attacked by Terravex workers. Creech is captured, and Tripp and Meredith are taken to Tenneson.

Dowd decides to help Tripp and Meredith rescue the creatures. They acquire two more trucks. They modify the trucks for Creech's parents to control. Dowd helps the group by stealing the Terravex truck on which Creech's parents are loaded. At the dealership, the creatures take control of the modified trucks, and the group make their escape up the mountain leading to the tunnels.

Terravex gives chase up the mountain and the group escapes. On the way, Rick helps Tripp and the group escape from Burke, preventing Burke from ramming them off the road and later stealing a large truck to block the road to prevent further pursuit. After realizing the poison has been inserted, Tripp gets into a head-on battle with Burke, who attempts to push him into the drilling hole, but ends when Tripp and Creech overturn Burke's truck, destroying the poison machine and presumably killing Burke when his truck is thrown into the equipment. Creech saves Tripp from drowning before he and his parents depart back home, and Terravex is exposed by the group for the experimentation that was harming the creatures' habitat. Tenneson is arrested for his crimes, Tripp and Rick develop on good terms and together rebuild a V8 engine for the truck, and Tripp and Meredith begin a relationship.

Cast

Production
On July 31, 2013, Paramount Animation announced that they were developing a new live-action/animated franchise, with an entry film titled Monster Trucks, and Jonathan Aibel and Glenn Berger set to write the film's script. The pitch was created by Paramount's president Adam Goodman alongside his four year old son. Chris Wedge was set to direct the film, which was produced by Mary Parent, with an initial release date set for May 29, 2015. Production took place in Vancouver Film Studios in Vancouver, British Columbia. On February 19, 2014, Jane Levy and Lucas Till joined the cast of the film. On March 24, Amy Ryan was cast in a role, and later that week, Holt McCallany joined the cast as a villain. On April 1, Frank Whaley and Danny Glover joined the cast of the film. Later that month, Thomas Lennon joined as well, and on April 14, Barry Pepper joined the cast. On April 24, Tucker Albrizzi, who starred in Nickelodeon's TV show Big Time Rush, joined the cast, with Rob Lowe added five days later.

In December 2013, it was announced that the film's production would begin in early April 2014 in Vancouver, with filming wrapping up in mid-July, and the studio Vancouver Film Studios was booked for the production. Principal photography began on April 4, 2014, in Kamloops, British Columbia. Filming was spotted on May 13, 2014 in downtown Chilliwack, British Columbia.

Release
The release date was shifted several times. It was initially set for May 29, 2015, but on January 26, 2015, the film was pushed back to December 25, 2015, a date first assigned for Mission: Impossible – Rogue Nation. On May 5, 2015, the film was pushed back again, to March 18, 2016. On November 10, 2015, the film's release date was pushed back one final time, to January 13, 2017.

On September 21, 2016, The Hollywood Reporter stated Paramount would take a $115 million writedown on the film because of its expected poor performance at the box office.

Home media
Monster Trucks was released on Digital HD on March 28, 2017 and on Blu-ray and DVD on April 11, 2017.

Reception

Box office
Monster Trucks grossed $33.4 million in the United States and Canada and $31.1 million in other territories, for a worldwide total of $64.5 million.

In North America, Monster Trucks was released alongside the openings of The Bye Bye Man and Sleepless, as well as the wide releases of Silence, Patriots Day and Live by Night, and was expected to gross $8–10 million from 3,119 theaters in its opening weekend. It ended up making $11 million ($14.2 million over the four-day MLK weekend), finishing 7th at the box office.

Due to its $125 million budget, as well as additional amounts spent on promotion, the film was labeled a box office bomb. Deadline Hollywood calculated the film lost the studio $123.1 million, when factoring together all expenses and revenues.

Critical response
The website's critical consensus reads, "Despite flashes of inspiration, the singularly high-concept Monster Trucks shows that it takes more than monsters and trucks to create a compelling feature film." On Metacritic, the film has a score of 41 out of 100 based on 23 critics, indicating "mixed or average reviews". Some contemporary reviews were more complimentary, however. Kristy Puchko cited it as a "treasure that feels like a heady relic from the '90s" in IndieWire's 2017 critic's survey of the Craziest Hollywood Movies of the 21st Century, while Sean Egan called it a "live-action cartoon that recalls the goofy, good-hearted Amblin family films of yore" in AM New York Metro's Best Films of 2017 list. Further, audiences polled by CinemaScore gave the film an average grade of "A" on an A+ to F scale.

By 2021, the film's reputation had improved slightly, with Douglas Laman of Looper observing that a cult following had developed for the film, while Chris Evangelista penned an essay for The Guardian arguing for the film's merits.

Possible sequel
Thomas Lennon mentioned on his Twitter in 2022 that he is still under contract for two sequels.

References

External links

 

 

 

2016 films
2016 3D films
2016 computer-animated films
2016 action comedy films
2010s science fiction comedy films
American action comedy films
American science fiction comedy films
American computer-animated films
American science fiction action films
Films directed by Chris Wedge
Films scored by David Sardy
Films set in North Dakota
Films shot in British Columbia
American films with live action and animation
Paramount Animation films
Nickelodeon Movies films
Paramount Pictures animated films
3D animated films
Films with screenplays by Derek Connolly
American children's comedy films
Films about trucks
2010s English-language films
2010s American films